Hellas Verona Football Club, commonly referred to as Hellas Verona or simply Verona, is a professional Italian football club based in Verona, Italy, that currently plays in Serie A. The team won the Serie A Championship in the 1984–85 season.

History

Origins and early history 
Founded in 1903 by a group of high school students, the club was named Hellas, at the request of a professor of classics. At a time in which football was played seriously only in the larger cities of northwestern Italy, most of Verona was indifferent to the growing sport. However, when in 1906 two city teams chose the city's Roman amphitheatre as a venue to showcase the game, crowd enthusiasm and media interest began to rise.

During these first few years, Hellas was one of three or four area teams playing at a municipal level while fighting against city rivals Bentegodi to become the city's premier football outfit. By the 1907–08 season, Hellas was playing against regional teams and an intense rivalry with Vicenza that lasts to this day was born.

From 1898 to 1926, Italian football was organised into regional groups. In this period, Hellas was one of the founding teams of the early league and often among its top final contenders. In 1911, the city helped Hellas replace the early, gritty football fields with a proper venue. This allowed the team to take part in its first regional tournament, which until 1926, was the qualifying stage for the national title.

In 1919, following a return to activity after a four-year suspension of all football competition in Italy during World War I, the team merged with city rival Verona and changed its name to Hellas Verona. Between 1926 and 1929, the elite "Campionato Nazionale" assimilated the top sides from the various regional groups and Hellas Verona joined the privileged teams, yet struggled to remain competitive.

Serie A, as it is structured today, began in 1929, when the Campionato Nazionale turned into a professional league. Still an amateur team, Hellas merged with two city rivals, Bentegodi and Scaligera, to form AC Verona. Hoping to build a first class contender for future years, the new team debuted in Serie B in 1929. It would take the gialloblu 28 years to finally achieve their goal. After first being promoted to Serie A for one season in 1957–58, in 1959, the team merged with another city rival (called Hellas) and commemorated its beginnings by changing its name to Hellas Verona AC.

Success in the 1970s and 1980s 
Coached by Nils Liedholm, the team returned to Serie A in 1968 and remained in the elite league almost without interruption until 1990. Along the way, it scored a famous 5–3 win in the 1972–73 season that cost Milan the scudetto (the Serie A title). The fact that the result came late during the last matchday of the season makes the sudden and unexpected end to the rossoneris title ambitions all the more memorable.

In 1973–74, Hellas finished the season in fourth-last, just narrowly avoiding relegation, but were nonetheless sent down to Serie B during the summer months as a result of a scandal involving team president Saverio Garonzi. After a year in Serie B, Hellas returned to Serie A.

In the 1975–76 season, the team had a successful run in the Coppa Italia, eliminating highly rated teams such as Torino, Cagliari and Internazionale from the tournament. However, in their first ever final in the competition, Hellas were trounced 4–0 by Napoli.

Under the leadership of coach Osvaldo Bagnoli, in 1982–83 the team secured a fourth-place in Serie A (its highest finish at the time) and even led the Serie A standings for a few weeks. The same season Hellas again reached the Coppa Italia final. After a 2–0 home victory, Hellas then travelled to Turin to play Juventus but were defeated 3–0 after extra time.

Further disappointment followed in the 1983–84 season when the team again reached the Coppa Italia final, only to lose the Cup in the final minutes of the return match against defending Serie A champions Roma

The team made its first European appearance in the 1983-84 UEFA Cup and were knocked out in the second round of the tournament by Sturm Graz. Hellas were eliminated from the 1985–86 European Cup in the second round by defending champions and fellow Serie A side Juventus after a contested game, the result of a scandalous arbitrage by the French Wurtz, having beaten PAOK of Greece in the first round.

In 1988, the team had their best international result when they reached the UEFA Cup quarterfinals with four victories and three draws. The decisive defeat came from German side Werder Bremen.

 1984–1985 Scudetto 
Although the 1984–85 season squad was made up of a mix of emerging players and mature stars, at the beginning of the season no one would have regarded the team as having the necessary ingredients to make it to the end. Certainly, the additions of Hans-Peter Briegel in midfield and of Danish striker Preben Elkjær to an attack that already featured the wing play of Pietro Fanna, the creative abilities of Antonio Di Gennaro and the scoring touch of Giuseppe Galderisi were to prove crucial.

To mention a few of the memorable milestones on the road to the scudetto: a decisive win against Juventus (2–0), with a goal scored by Elkjær after having lost a boot in a tackle just outside the box, set the stage early in the championship; an away win over Udinese (5–3) ended any speculation that the team was losing energy at the midway point; three straight wins (including a hard-fought 1–0 victory against a strong Roma side) served notice that the team had kept its polish and focus intact during their rival's final surge; and a 1–1 draw in Bergamo against Atalanta secured the title with a game in hand.

Hellas finished the year with a 15–13–2 record and 43 points, four points ahead of Torino with Internazionale and Sampdoria rounding out the top four spots. This unusual final table of the Serie A (with the most successful Italian teams of the time, Juventus and Roma, ending up much lower than expected) has led to many speculations. The 1984–85 season was the only season when referees were assigned to matches by way of a random draw. Before then each referee had always been assigned to a specific match by a special commission of referees (designatori arbitrali). After the betting scandal of the early 1980 (the Calcio Scommesse scandal), it was decided to clean up the image of Italian football by assigning referees randomly instead of picking them, to clear up all the suspicions and accusations always accompanying Italy's football life. This resulted in a quieter championship and in a completely unexpected final table.

In the following season, won again by Juventus, the choice of the referees went back in the hands of the designatori arbitrali. In 2006, a major scandal in Italian football revealed that certain clubs had been illegally influencing the referee selection process in an attempt to ensure that certain referees were assigned to their matches.

 Between Serie A and Serie B 
These were more than mere modest achievements for a mid-size city with a limited appeal to fans across the nation. But soon enough financial difficulties caught up with team managers. In 1991 the team folded and was reborn as Verona, regularly moving to and fro between Serie A and Serie B for several seasons. In 1995 the name was officially changed back to Hellas Verona.

After a three-year stay, their last stint in Serie A ended in grief in 2002. That season emerging international talents such as Adrian Mutu, Mauro Camoranesi, Alberto Gilardino, Martin Laursen, Massimo Oddo, Marco Cassetti and coach Alberto Malesani failed to capitalise on an excellent start and eventually dropped into fourth-to-last place for the first time all season on the final match day, enforcing relegation into Serie B.

 Decline and Serie A comeback (2002–present) 
Following the 2002 relegation to Serie B, team fortunes continued to slip throughout the decade. In the 2003–04 season Hellas Verona struggled in Serie B and spent most of the season fighting off an unthinkable relegation to Serie C1. Undeterred, the fans supported their team and a string of late season wins eventually warded off the danger. Over 5,000 of them followed Hellas to Como on the final day of the season to celebrate.

In 2004–05, things looked much brighter for the team. After a rocky start, Hellas put together a string of results and climbed to third spot. The gialloblù held on to the position until January 2005, when transfers weakened the team, yet they managed to take the battle for Serie A to the last day of the season.

The 2006–07 Serie B seemed to start well, due to the club takeover by Pietro Arvedi D'Emilei, which ended nine years of controversial leadership under chairman Gianbattista Pastorello, heavily contested by the supporters in his later years at Verona. However, Verona was immediately involved in the relegation battle, and Massimo Ficcadenti was replaced in December 2006 by Giampiero Ventura. Despite a recovery in the results, Verona ended in an 18th place, thus being forced to play a two-legged playoff against 19th-placed Spezia to avert relegation. A 2–1 away loss in the first leg at La Spezia was followed by a 0–0 home tie, and Verona were relegated to Serie C1 after 64 years of play in the two highest divisions.

Verona appointed experienced coach Franco Colomba for the new season with the aim to return to Serie B as soon as possible. However, despite being widely considered the division favourite, the gialloblù spent almost the entire season in last place. After seven matches, club management sacked Colomba in early October and replaced him with youth team coach (and former Verona player) Davide Pellegrini. A new owner acquired the club in late 2007, appointing Giovanni Galli in December as new director of football and Maurizio Sarri as new head coach. Halfway through the 2007–08 season, the team remained at the bottom of Serie C1, on the brink of relegation to the fourth level (Serie C2). In response, club management sacked Sarri and brought back Pellegrini. Thanks to a late-season surge the scaligeri avoided direct relegation by qualifying for the relegation play-off, and narrowly averted dropping to Lega Pro Seconda Divisione in the final game, beating Pro Patria 2–1 on aggregate. However, despite the decline in results, attendance and season ticket sales remained at 15,000 on average.

For the 2008–09 season, Verona appointed former Sassuolo and Piacenza manager Gian Marco Remondina with the aim to win promotion to Serie B. However, the season did not start impressively, with Verona being out of the playoff zone by mid-season, and club chairman Pietro Arvedi D'Emilei entering into a coma after being involved in a car crash on his way back from a league match in December 2008. Arvedi died in March 2009, two months after the club was bought by new chairman Giovanni Martinelli.

The following season looked promising, as new transfer players were brought aboard, and fans enthusiastically embraced the new campaign. Season ticket figures climbed to over 10,000, placing Verona ahead of several Serie A teams and all but Torino in Serie B attendance. The team led the standings for much of the season, accumulating a seven-point lead by early in the spring. However, the advantage was gradually squandered, and the team dropped to second place on the second-last day of the season, with a chance to regain first place in the final regular season match against Portogruaro on home soil. Verona, however, disappointed a crowd of over 25,000 fans and, with the loss, dropped to third place and headed towards the play-offs. A managerial change for the post-season saw the firing of Remondina and the arrival of Giovanni Vavassori. After eliminating Rimini in the semi-finals (1–0; 0–0) Verona lost the final to Pescara (2–2 on home soil and 0–1 in the return match) and were condemned to a fourth-straight year of third division football.

Former 1990 World Cup star Giuseppe Giannini (a famous captain of Roma for many years) signed as manager for the 2010–11 campaign. Once again, the team was almost entirely revamped during the transfer season. The squad struggled in the early months and Giannini was eventually sacked and replaced by former Internazionale defender Andrea Mandorlini, who succeeded in reorganising the team's play and bringing discipline both on and off the pitch. In the second half of the season, Verona climbed back from the bottom of the division to clinch a play-off berth (fifth place) on the last day of the regular season. The team advanced to the play-off final after eliminating Sorrento in the semi-finals 3–1 on aggregate. Following the play-off final, after four years of Lega Pro football, Verona were promoted back to Serie B after a 2–1 aggregate win over Salernitana on 19 June 2011.

On 18 May 2013, Verona finished second in Serie B and were promoted to Serie A after an eleven-year absence. Their return to the top flight began against title contenders Milan and Roma, beating the former 2–1 and losing to the latter 3–0. The team continued at a steady pace, finishing the first half of the season with 32 points and sitting in sixth place, eleven points behind the closest UEFA Champions League spot—and tied with Internazionale for the final UEFA Europa League spot. Verona, however, ultimately finished the year in tenth.

During the 2015–16 season, Verona had not won a single match since the beginning of the campaign until the club edged Atalanta 2–1 on 3 February 2016 in a win at home; coming twenty-three games into the season. Consequently, Verona were relegated from Serie A.

In the 2016–17 Serie B season, Hellas Verona finished second on the table and were automatically promoted back to Serie A. Hellas lasted one season back in the top division after finishing second last during the 2017–18 Serie A season and were relegated back to Serie B. At the end of the 2018–19 season, Hellas finished in fifth position and achieved promotion back to Serie A after defeating Cittadella 3–0 in the second leg of their promotion play-off to win 3–2 on aggregate.

The club's return to the top flight in the 2019–20 Serie A season, in which it was considered a strong relegation candidate at the beginning of the campaign, was a successful one, with a ninth-placed finish. Heavily reliant on the defensive solidity of 20-year-old centre-back Marash Kumbulla, Amir Rrahmani and goalkeeper Marco Silvestri, along with the consistent performances of midfielder Sofyan Amrabat, Verona was a surprise contender for Europa League qualification but fell out of the race after a downturn in form after the coronavirus break which temporarily halted the season. A 2-1 win at home against eventual title winners Juventus in February was a highlight of a season in which the club achieved 10 clean sheets and punched towards the higher end of the table despite its modest budget.

Ahead of Verona’s second consecutive year in Serie A, key players Amrabat, Rrahmani and Kumbulla were poached by Fiorentina, Napoli and Roma respectively, and loanee Matteo Pessina returned to Atalanta. This left the club with a heavily weakened squad and it was once again expected to struggle in the league prior to the season-opening match. Despite these losses in the transfer window, Verona again finished in the top half of the league table, ending the season in 10th place with 45 points. Successful breakout seasons for attacking midfielder Mattia Zaccagni, who was eventually called up to the Italian national team as a reward for his performances, as well as wing-backs Federico Dimarco and Davide Faraoni, were partly the reason for this achievement. At the end of the season, coach Ivan Jurić was appointed by Torino following his two impressive Serie A seasons with Verona, with the Gialloblu replacing him with Eusebio Di Francesco.

Following another summer transfer window in which several of the club's star players were sold to Serie A rivals, namely Zaccagni transferring to Lazio, Marco Silvestri to Udinese and Dimarco returning to Inter, the beginning of the 2021-22 season proved to be much more difficult for Verona, as Di Francesco was fired and replaced with Igor Tudor after just three matches, all of which were defeats. This poor early-season form had left the club at the bottom of the table. Under the guidance of Tudor, the team regains competitiveness obtaining in the next eight matches three wins - including victories with Lazio and Juventus - four draws and only one defeat.

 Colours and badge 
The team's colours are yellow and blue. As a result the clubs most widely used nickname is gialloblu literally "yellow-blue" in Italian. The colours represent the city itself and Verona's emblem (a yellow cross on a blue shield) appears on most team apparel. Home kits are traditionally blue, sometimes of a navy shade, combined with yellow details and trim, although the club has used a blue and yellow striped design on occasion. Two more team nicknames are Mastini (the mastiffs) and Scaligeri, both references to Mastino I della Scala of the Della Scala princes that ruled the city during the 13th and 14th centuries.

The Scala family coat of arms is depicted on the team's jersey and on its trademark logo as a stylised image of two large, powerful mastiffs facing opposite directions, introduced in 1995. In essence, the term "scaligeri" is synonymous with Veronese, and therefore can describe anything or anyone from Verona (e.g., Chievo Verona, a different team that also links itself to the Scala family – specifically to Cangrande I della Scala).

 Stadium 
Since 1963, the club have played at the Stadio Marc'Antonio Bentegodi, which has a capacity of 39,211. The ground was shared with Hellas's rivals, Chievo Verona until 2021. It was used as a venue for some matches of the 1990 FIFA World Cup.

 Derby with Chievo Verona 
The intercity fixtures against Chievo Verona are known as the "Derby della Scala". The name refers to the Scaligeri or della Scala aristocratic family, who were rulers of Verona during the Middle Ages and early Renaissance. In the season 2001–02, both Hellas Verona and the city rivals of Chievo Verona were playing in the Serie A. The first ever derby of Verona in Serie A took place on 18 November 2001, while both teams were ranked among the top four. The match was won by Hellas, 3–2. Chievo got revenge in the return match in spring 2002, winning 2–1. Verona thus became the fifth city in Italy, after Milan, Rome, Turin and Genoa to host a cross-town derby in Serie A.

 Honours Serie A Champions: 1984–85Serie B'''
 Champions: 1956–57, 1981–82, 1998–99

Divisional movements

 Sponsors 

 Kit sponsors 
 1980–87: Adidas
 1987–89: Hummel
 1989–91: Adidas
 1991–95: Uhlsport
 1995–00: Errea
 2000–03: Lotto
 2003–06: Legea
 2006–13: Asics
 2013–18: Nike
 2018–present: Macron

 Official sponsors 
 1982–86: Canon
 1989–96: Rana
 1996–97: Ferroli 
 1997–98: ZG Camini Inox
 1998–99: Atreyu Immobiliare
 1999–00: Salumi Marsilli
 2000–01: Net Business
 2001–02: Amica Chips
 2002–06: Clerman
 2006–07: Unika
 2007–08: No sponsor 2008–10: Giallo
 2010–11: Banca Di Verona/Sicurint Group, Protec/Consorzio Asimov
 2011–12: AGSM/Sicurint Group, Protec/Leaderform
 2012–13: AGSM, Leaderform
 2013–14: Franklin & Marshall/Manila Grace, AGSM/Leaderform
 2014–15: Franklin & Marshall, AGSM/Leaderform
 2015–2018: Metano Nord, Leaderform
 2018–present: AirDolomiti, Gruppo Sinergy
 2020-present: Kiratech S.P.A.

 Current squad 

 First-team squad 

 Other players under contract 
.

Out on loan
. 

 

Club staff

 Managers 

 András Kuttik (1929–1932)
 Sándor Peics (1939)
 Karl Stürmer (1941–1942)
 Luigi Ferrero (1954)
 Federico Allasio (1955)
 Aldo Olivieri (1959–1960)
 Romolo Bizzotto (1960–1961)
 Giancarlo Cadé (1964–1965)
 Omero Tognon (1965–1966)
 Nils Liedholm (1966–1968)
 Giancarlo Cadé (1968–1969, 1972–1975)
 Luigi Mascalaito (1974–1979)
 Ferruccio Valcareggi (1975–1978)
 Giuseppe Chiappella (1978–1979)
 Fernando Veneranda (1979–1980)
 Giancarlo Cadé (1980–1981)
 Osvaldo Bagnoli (1981–1990)
 Eugenio Fascetti (1 July 1990 – 28 March 1992)
 Nils Liedholm (29 March 1992 – 30 June 1992)
 Edoardo Reja (1 July 1992 – 30 June 1993)
 Bortolo Mutti (1 July 1994 – 30 June 1995)
 Attilio Perotti (1 July 1995 – 30 June 1996)
 Luigi Cagni (1 July 1996 – 30 June 1998)
 Cesare Prandelli (1 July 1998 – 30 June 2000)
 Attilio Perotti (1 July 2000 – 30 June 2001)
 Alberto Malesani (4 July 2001 – 10 June 2003)
 Sandro Salvioni (1 July 2003 – 30 June 2004)
 Massimo Ficcadenti (20 July 2004 – 24 December 2006)
 Giampiero Ventura (24 December 2006 – 30 June 2007)
 Franco Colomba (1 July 2007 – 8 October 2007)
 Davide Pellegrini (9 October 2007 – 30 December 2007)
 Maurizio Sarri (31 December 2007 – 27 February 2008)
 Davide Pellegrini (28 February 2008 – 11 June 2008)
 Gian Marco Remondina (12 June 2008 – 10 May 2010)
 Giovanni Vavassori (10 May 2010 – 21 June 2010)
 Giuseppe Giannini (22 June 2010 – 8 November 2010)
 Andrea Mandorlini (9 November 2010 – 30 November 2015)
 Luigi Delneri (1 December 2015 – 23 May 2016)
 Fabio Pecchia (1 June 2016 – 21 June 2018)
 Fabio Grosso (21 June 2018 – 1 May 2019)
 Ivan Jurić (14 June 2019 – 28 May 2021)
 Eusebio Di Francesco (1 June 2021 – 14 September 2021)
 Igor Tudor (14 September 2021 - 28 May 2022)
 Gabriele Cioffi (1 June 2022 -  present'')

World Cup players
The following players have been selected by their country for the FIFA World Cup finals while playing for Hellas Verona.

  Roberto Tricella (1986)
  Antonio Di Gennaro (1986)
  Giuseppe Galderisi (1986)
  Preben Elkjær (1986)
  Hans-Peter Briegel (1986)
  Nelson Gutiérrez (1990)
  Ruslan Nigmatullin (2002)
  Anthony Šerić (2002)
  Lee Seung-woo (2018)
  Ajdin Hrustic (2022)
  Ivan Ilić (2022)
  Darko Lazović (2022)
  Martin Hongla (2022)

In Europe

European Cup

UEFA Cup

References

Further reading

External links 

  

 
Football clubs in Italy
Football clubs in Veneto
Association football clubs established in 1903
Italian football First Division clubs
Serie A clubs
Serie B clubs
Serie C clubs
Serie A winning clubs
1903 establishments in Italy
Sport in Verona